The Thin Line (translit. Al Hevel Dak) is a 1980 Israeli drama art film written and directed by Michal Bat-Adam. The film was selected as the Israeli entry for the Best Foreign Language Film at the 53rd Academy Awards, but was not accepted as a nominee.

Cast
 Gila Almagor as Paula
 Alexander Peleg as Nadav (as Alex Peled)
 Liat Pansky as Nili
 Aya Veirov as Maya
 Avner Hizkiyahu as Dr. Greber
 Svetlana Mazovetskaya as Dressmaker (as S. Mazovetzkaya)
 S. Greenspan as Degarit
 Kina L. Hanegbi as Bina
 Irit Mohr-Alter as Zila
 Miri Fabian as Nurse

See also
 List of submissions to the 53rd Academy Awards for Best Foreign Language Film
 List of Israeli submissions for the Academy Award for Best Foreign Language Film

References

External links
 

1980 films
1980 drama films
Israeli drama films
1980s Hebrew-language films
Films directed by Michal Bat-Adam
Films set in Tel Aviv